Harleston was a railway station in Harleston, Norfolk, on the Waveney Valley Line. It was an early post-war closure; passenger services on this line were withdrawn in 1953 with goods trains lasting until the complete closure of the line in 1966.

References

Disused railway stations in Norfolk
Former Great Eastern Railway stations
Railway stations in Great Britain opened in 1855
Railway stations in Great Britain closed in 1953
Harleston, Norfolk